Brenton Anthony Parchment (born  24 June 1982) is a Jamaican former professional cricketer. Born in St Elizabeth, he was the West Indies under-19 captain on the side's tour of England in 2001. This team was the only West Indies Under-19 team to beat England at home. Parchment made his full international debut in 2007 for the West Indies cricket team and played two Test matches, seven One Day Internationals and a single Twenty20 International in 2007 and 2008.

Parchment played first-class and List A cricket for Jamaica. As well as this, he plays as a professional for English cricket clubs. He was the professional cricketer for Middlesbrough Cricket Club in 2003–04. During his first season with them, they won the Cup. In 2005 he was the professional for Farnworth Cricket Club. He helped them to win both the League and Cup in the Bolton League, and to honour him they named the club's games room after him. In 2010 he played for Blackrod Cricket Club in the Bolton Association and broke the club's highest score record on his debut with 184 not out.
He played in the Lancashire League at Haslingden Cricket Club in 2013 season and North County CC, playing in LCU Division 1.

External links

1982 births
Living people
Jamaican cricketers
West Indian cricket captains
West Indies One Day International cricketers
West Indies Twenty20 International cricketers
West Indies Test cricketers
People from Saint Elizabeth Parish
Jamaica cricketers